Evgeni Bozhanov (Bulgarian: Евгени Божанов) (born in Rousse, Bulgaria on 10 March 1984) is a Bulgarian pianist who trained with Evgeny Zhelyazkov at the National School of Arts "Prof. Vesselin Stoyanov" in Rousse (Bulgaria). From 2001 to 2006, he studied with Boris Bloch at the Folkwang Hochschule Essen and from 2006 he continued his studies with Georg Friedrich Schenck at the Robert Schumann Hochschule Düsseldorf.

Competitions
He has garnered worldwide attention after his charismatic performances at the 2009 Thirteenth Van Cliburn International Piano Competition, the 2010 Queen Elisabeth Music Competition in Brussels and the XVI International Chopin Piano Competition in Warsaw.

In 2010, he won the Second Prize at the 16th International Queen Elisabeth Piano Competition, and a few months later was awarded Fourth Prize at the XVI Fryderyk Chopin International Piano Competition. Whether he refused his prize and the attendant monetary award is a matter of ongoing speculation fueled by the fact that he did not participate in the Prize Winner's concerts "for reasons outside the competition".

The Chopin Competition jury had decided at the time of the final round to suddenly change the rules of judging by discarding the point system, where Bozhanov was consistently in 2nd place through the 3rd round, in favor of a ranking system for the final (concerto) round and competition. The latest published jury voting details on the final round provides proof of the large variation in judgment of Bozhanov's performances, with his being ranked first or second place by some and 9th or 10th place by others. Such a rule change at the last minute of the competition was not explained or given reasons by either the chairman of the jury nor jury members in public, calling the impartiality of the procedure into question.

Prizes in international competitions
1999 International Frédéric Chopin Competition Varna, Bulgaria - 1st prize
2000 Jeunesses Musicales Competition Bucharest, Romania - 1st prize
2006 Carl Bechstein IPC, Essen, Germany - 1st prize
2008 Alessandro Casagrande IPC, Terni, Italy - 1st prize
 2008 Sviatoslav Richter IPC, Moscow, Russia - 2nd prize (1st void).
 2009 Thirteenth Van Cliburn International Piano Competition, Fort Worth (Texas), USA - finalist.
 2010 Queen Elisabeth Music Competition, Brussels, Belgium - 2nd prize.
 2010 XVI International Chopin Piano Competition, Warsaw, Poland - 4th prize

References

External links
 www.evgenibozhanov.com
 Vermont Classics 

Bulgarian classical pianists
1984 births
Living people
Prize-winners of the International Chopin Piano Competition
Prize-winners of the Queen Elisabeth Competition
People from Ruse, Bulgaria
Male classical pianists